Despot Stefan may refer to:

 Stefan Lazarević, Serbian prince and despot (1389-1427)
 Stefan Branković, Serbian despot, proclaimed in 1458
 Stefan Berislavić, Serbian titular despot, proclaimed in 1520

See also
 Despot (title) 
 Stefan (name)
 Despot (disambiguation)
 Stefan (disambiguation)
 Despot Jovan (disambiguation)